Tolerable daily intake (TDI) refers to the daily amount of a chemical that has been assessed safe for human being on long-term basis (usually whole lifetime). Originally acceptable daily intake (ADI) was introduced in 1961 to define the daily intake of a food additive which, during the entire lifetime, appears to be without appreciable risk. For contaminants and other foreign chemicals not used intentionally, the term TDI is often preferred. Both ADI and TDI are usually assessed based on animal experiments, and it is most often hundreds of times lower than the dose causing no observable adverse effect (NOAEL) in the most sensitive tested animal species. Because the confounding factors (safety factors) may vary depending on the quality of data and the type of adverse effect, TDI values are not good estimates of the harmfulness of chemicals, and must be considered administrative tools to set allowable limits for chemicals, rather than scientific measures. The threshold limit value (TLV) of a chemical substance is a level to which it is believed a worker can be exposed day after day for a working lifetime without adverse effects.

References

Toxicology

fr:dose journalière tolérable
zh:每日耐受量
ja:耐容一日摂取量